Lidia Gal is an Israeli chess player. She is a winner the Israeli Women's Chess Championship (1971).

Biography
From the early 1970s to the early 1980s, Lidia Gal was one of Israel's leading female chess players. In 1971, she won 
Israeli Women's Chess Championship.

Lidia Gal played for Israel in the Women's Chess Olympiads:
 In 1972, at second board in the 5th Chess Olympiad (women) in Skopje (+4, =4, -0),
 In 1982, at third board in the 10th Chess Olympiad (women) in Lucerne (+2, =4, -3).

References

External links

Lidia Gal chess games at 365Chess.com

Israeli female chess players
Chess Olympiad competitors
Living people
Year of birth missing (living people)